Ézaro (officially known as O Ézaro (Santa Uxía)) is a parish part of the municipality of Dumbría, in the province of A Coruña, in the autonomous community of Galicia of northwestern Spain. It belongs to the comarca of Fisterra. It had a population of 600 inhabitants  in 2019.

Geography 

It is the only parish of the Dumbría municipality bordering the sea, the Atlantic Ocean. It is 100 kilometres away from A Coruña and it is located in the region called Costa da Morte.

The area of the parish is 13.2 km². It is crossed by the river Xallas, which flows into the sea in the waterfall called Fervenza do Ézaro. Nowadays the water flows permanently by the waterfall, while years ago it only happened during weekends (when the floodgates of the upstream dam were opened). Near the waterfall, it is located the Museum of the Electricity  and the start of the road climb to Mirador de Ézaro .

The main urban area has a landscaped promenade bordering its blue flag-awarded beach of fine sand called Praia do Ézaro.

Populated entities 

Related hamlets within this parish:
 Cancelo, O
 Castelo, O
 Covas, As
 Estrada, A
 Ézaro, O
 Finsín
 Lagoelas, As
 Laxe, A
 Lombiño, O
 Pena, A
 Río do Barco
 San Crimenzo
 Santa Uxía
 Santo, O

Demography 
From:INE Archiv

Festivals 

Its Summer Festival (A festa da praia) is celebrated in August.

References

Populated places in the Province of A Coruña